Toronto is one of Canada's leading tourism destinations. In 2017, the Toronto-area received 43.7 million tourists, of which 10.4 million were domestic visitors and 2.97 million were from the United States, spending a total of $8.84 billion. Toronto has an array of tourist attractions and a rich cultural life.

Attractions

Museums

The city of Toronto consists of many unique and famous museums. The Royal Ontario Museum is Canada's largest museum of natural history and world cultures. It presents engaging galleries of art, archaeology and natural science from around the world. It is located at 100 Queens Park in Toronto. The Royal Ontario Museum offers a unique platform to engage with cultures from all around the world at the centre of one of North America's busiest cities. The Art Gallery of Ontario (AGO) is one of the largest art museums in North America. Its collection of approximately 95,000 works includes many genres from around the world. The Bata Shoe Museum consists of shoes from many different geographic areas, time periods, and cultural groups. It is located at 327 Bloor Street West, and it contains 12,500 artifacts that are exhibited time to time at specific exhibitions. For hockey fans, the Hockey Hall of Fame is the biggest attraction, as it is more than 57,000 square feet of interactivity, hands-on games, theatres, the Stanley Cup and the finest collection of hockey artifacts from not only Canada but also around the world. Other museums include the Aga Khan Museum, Gardiner Museum of Ceramic Art, Ukraine Museum of Canada, Toronto Police Museum and Discovery Centre, Textile Museum of Canada, the Museum of Inuit Art, Oral History Museum and many others.

Zoos and Aquarium

The Toronto Zoo is Canada's premier zoo that includes over 5,000 animals, which represent about 500 different species. The High Park Zoo is also located in Toronto, which comprises 399 acres of land that includes animals including peacocks, deers, sheep and others. More than 250,000 people visit the High Park Zoo every year. Various farms are also present in Toronto, which include substantial numbers of farm animals. Furthermore, Ripley's Aquarium of Canada is an attraction that is located in downtown Toronto. It is Canada's largest indoor aquarium, which means that it is easily accessible in not only the summer but also the winter time. It consists of 5.7 million litres of water, representing marine and freshwater habitats from all around the world.

CN Tower 
The CN Tower is Canada's National Tower, and it is one of the attractions that is open 364 days a year. It is visited by approximately 2 million people every year. In 1995, the CN Tower was classified as one of the Seven Wonders of the Modern World by the American Society of Civil Engineers, and for more than 30 years it was the world's tallest free-standing structure. The CN Tower consists of many inner attractions like the Glass Floor, SkyPod, 360 restaurant and EdgeWalk. EdgeWalk is a full circle hands-free walk on a 5 feet wide ledge encircling the top of the Tower, which is 1,168 feet aboveground. It has also been mentioned in the Guinness Book of World Records for the highest external walk on a building. Also, the CN Tower provides various services for individuals with disabilities and special needs.

Tours
There are a number of tours of different kinds available to visitors in Toronto, giving them the chance to view the city or specific areas of the city, led by local guides. Some of these include:

Bus tours within in the city (e.g. City Sightseeing Toronto), showcasing some of the major attractions and points of interest, as well as day tours to the nearby Niagara Falls

Boat tours on Lake Ontario (e.g. Toronto Harbour Tours), which show guests the Toronto skyline from the water and give them a close-up view of the Toronto Islands.

Food tours (e.g. Tasty Tours), walking tours that guide guests to some of Toronto's foodie hotspots for samples and a history of the area. These tours usually aim to highlight the variety of cuisines in Toronto, sometimes focusing on the dense food scenes in specific areas (e.g. Kensington Market).

Haunted Tours (e.g. The Haunted Walk of Toronto), these evening tours take guests to some of the city's oldest and most haunted buildings and neighbourhoods (e.g. Black Creek Pioneer Village, where they also offer a séance).

Segway Tours (e.g. Go Tours Canada), these tours provide guests with their own Segway, helmet, and crash course on Segway driving, before leading them on a short tour of the area. Due to regulations, the tours are not city-wide, often occurring in smaller neighbourhoods with little vehicular traffic (e.g. The Distillery District).

Bicycle Tours (e.g. Toronto Bicycle Tours), giving guests an opportunity to see more of the city in a short space of time, while following their microphone-wearing guide.

References